The Furman University Asian Garden is an Asian-style garden located on the campus of Furman University at 3300 Poinsett Highway, Greenville, South Carolina. It is open daily without charge.

Furman University has a long-term exchange program with Kansai Gaidai University in Hirakata, Osaka, Japan. The Japanese garden reflects this relationship, and includes a small teahouse, and a Hei-Sei-Ji temple that was originally standing in Nagoya.

See also

 List of botanical gardens in the United States

References

External links
 Furman University Campus Map

Botanical gardens in South Carolina
Japanese gardens in the United States
Geography of Greenville, South Carolina
Furman University
Protected areas of Greenville County, South Carolina
Tourist attractions in Greenville, South Carolina